Elizabeth Stanton (born December 18, 1995) is an American television presenter and actress. She hosts her own syndicated E/I television series Elizabeth Stanton's Great Big World, and is also the host of World's Funniest Animals on The CW. As an actress, she portrayed the role of Liz Sandler on the teen sitcom This Just In.

Filmography

References

External links
 
 

American entertainers
Living people
21st-century American actresses
1995 births